Utricularia babui is a perennial carnivorous plant that belongs to the genus Utricularia. It is native to India and had only been collected from the Kolhapur district at the time of its description in 2005. Specimens of U. babui were previously mistaken for U. graminifolia. It was originally described and published by Shrirang Ramchandra Yadav, M. M. Sardesai, and S. P. Gaikwad in 2005.

A study of the Utricularia of Thailand published in 2010 found U. babui in Chiang Mai Province, northern Thailand.

See also
 List of Utricularia species

References

External links

Carnivorous plants of Asia
Flora of India (region)
Flora of Thailand
Plants described in 2005
babui